Bouillon Chartier, or simply Chartier, is a "bouillon" restaurant in Paris founded in 1896, located in the 9th arrondissement and classified as a monument historique since 1989.

History 
The restaurant was created in 1896 by two brothers, Frédéric and Camille Chartier, in a building resembling a railway station concourse.
The long Belle Époque dining room has a high ceiling supported by large columns which allows for a mezzanine, where service is also provided.

It opened with the name "Le Bouillon" (lit. broth, or stock, but in this context, a type of brasserie; originally a cheap workers' eatery that served stew), near the Grands Boulevards, the Hôtel Drouot, the Musée Grévin, and the Palais de la Bourse. The restaurant has had only four owners since opening.

Service 
The restaurant is open 365 days a year with a menu offering traditional French cuisine. The table service is provided by waiting staff dressed in the traditional rondin, a tight-fitting black waistcoat with multiple pockets and a long white apron.

The restaurant's popularity leads to lines in the courtyard or under the porch and sometimes on the sidewalk outside. Tables are shared between strangers. The bill is written directly on the disposable paper tablecloth at the end of the meal. Serving stops at 11:30 PM.

In popular culture 
 The restaurant is mentioned in Albert Willemetz's 1939 song "Félicie aussi", sung by Fernandel.
 In Les beaux quartiers, Louis Aragon mentioned Le bouillon Chartier: the young medical student character Edmond Barbentane has lunch there regularly.

See also 
 List of tourist attractions in Paris

Notes

External links

Restaurants in Paris
Buildings and structures in the 9th arrondissement of Paris
Tourist attractions in Paris
19th century in France
1896 establishments in France
Restaurants established in 1896
Belle Époque